On June 8, 2011 a consortium of four leading telecom carriers from four countries signed the Construction and Maintenance Agreement for the new cable system — Europe-Persia Express Gateway (EPEG).

The EPEG will be a brand new high capacity fiber optic cable system which links Europe with the Middle East and a possibility of further extension to Persian Gulf regional countries and the Indian subcontinent.

The system will pass from Frankfurt across Eastern Europe, Russia, Azerbaijan, Iran and Persian Gulf to Barka, Sultanate of Oman. EPEG members Cable & Wireless, Rostelecom, Omantel, and TIC (Telecommunication Infrastructure Company of I.R.Iran) will build and develop part of the network which operates through their own country. The route via Azerbaijan will be organized on the basis of the capacity of the EPEG associated partner — Delta Telecom. The design capacity of the new EPEG system will be up to 3.2 Tbit/s with total length approximately 10,000 km, about 9,500 km is a terrestrial fiber cable.

EPEG will allow telecommunication transit route alternative to the Red Sea, Suez Canal, Egypt and the Mediterranean Sea regions and can play an important role for traffic re-routing in case of earthquakes and disasters, which have been known to affect multiple systems at once.

References

External links
 Europe-Persia Express Gateway
 Telecommunication Infrastructure Company of Islamic Republic of Iran

Optical telecommunications cables

Telecommunications in Iran
Internet in Iran
Telecommunications in Azerbaijan
Internet in Azerbaijan